Luba Norma Grigorovitch (born 5 June 1985) is an Australian Labor Party politician and former trade union official.

Since the 2022 state election, she has been the representative of the District of Kororoit in the Victorian Legislative Assembly, sitting as a backbencher. Prior to the election, she was a state secretary of the Rail, Tram and Bus Union (RTBU). She is a member of the Industrial Left faction of the Victorian ALP.

She is married to Ben Gray, a founding partner of private equity firm BGH Capital, and the son of the former Liberal Premier of Tasmania, Robin Gray.

Early life and education 
Grigorovitch was born in Altona. Her parents separated when she was young, due to domestic violence. She was raised mostly by her mother, who cared for her and her brother Robbie, as well as her uncle Ken, who had an intellectual disability.

She attended secondary school at Mount St. Joseph Girls' College in Altona. When she was twelve, she was present during a visit by Joan Kirner, the first female premier of Victoria. Her mother was an ALP member and noticed her daughter's enthusiasm about this encounter, encouraging her to attend a party branch meeting. After that, Grigorovitch became an active member of her local branch.

She attended Melbourne's Victoria University, completing a double bachelor degree in Arts and Business.

Career 
In 2009, Grigorovitch was elected as a councillor for the City of Hobsons Bay. She was re-elected in 2012, and assumed the role of Deputy Mayor.

Her involvement with the RTBU began in 2010. Her initial role in the union was as an industrial officer and women's officer in its Victorian branch. In 2011, she became an elected organiser and women's officer for one of its divisions.

In 2014, she became the first female, and youngest, state secretary of the RTBU. During her tenure as the state secretary, the union undertook industrial action in pursuit of enterprise agreements with Metro Trains and Yarra Trams. There was also an unsuccessful campaign in 2017 to pressure the Andrews Labor Government to return Victoria's railways to public ownership.

In 2015, Grigorovitch was elected to the national body of the ACTU executive. In 2019, she was appointed national president of the RTBU, serving until 14 December 2022. She was the first female national president of the union.

In December 2021, she was preselected as Labor's candidate for the safe seat of Kororoit. The incumbent member, Marlene Kairouz, attempted to retain preselection but was defeated in internal party processes. Following that, in April 2022, Grigorovitch resigned as the state secretary of the RTBU and was succeeded by Vik Sharma. John Setka spoke at her farewell event in June of that year.

Parliamentary career 
Grigorovitch was elected as the member for Kororoit at the 2022 Victorian state election. As of February 2023, she is a backbencher.

Personal life 
In 2017, Grigorovitch attended the Australian American Leadership Dialogue where she met Ben Gray. He later founded the Australian private equity firm BGH Capital, with business partners Robin Bishop and Simon Harle. In December 2020, The Age reported that the two had been quietly dating.

In January 2023, Grigorovitch and Gray married at their $30m Portsea mansion.  Former Greens MLC, Colleen Hartland, officiated. 
The wedding was attended by many of Victoria's political, business, and union elite, including Premier Daniel Andrews, Public Transport Minister Ben Carroll, union leader John Setka, and Alan Tudge M.P., who was best man. Reportedly, the event was a popular topic of discussion among Victorian politicians even a week after the date.

The couple's ownership of a $30m mansion has also been a talking point in Victorian political circles, with the Herald Sun reporting speculation that it would be used by opponents to harm her political image. In response to a request for comment on the issue, Grigorovitch stated she was "proudly a woman from the west", and pointed to her having a mortgage being paid in her own name.

According to her parliamentary register of interests, Grigorovitch is a landlord, owning a rental property in Southbank, as well as industrial land in Altona. Her partner runs the Australian private equity firm BGH capital. The declaration incorrectly listed that company as "Australia's largest private equity firm".

Notes

References

Hansard 

1985 births
Living people
Members of the Victorian Legislative Assembly
People from Altona, Victoria
21st-century Australian politicians
21st-century Australian women politicians
Australian Labor Party members of the Parliament of Victoria
Women members of the Victorian Legislative Assembly
Australian people of Russian descent